Church of St Mary and All Saints may refer to:

 Church of St. Mary and All Saints, Bingham, Nottinghamshire, England
 St Mary's and All Saints Church, Boxley, Kent, England
 St Mary's and All Saints' Church, Checkley, Staffordshire, England
 Church of St Mary and All Saints, Chesterfield, Derbyshire, England
 Church of St Mary and All Saints, Droxford, Hampshire, England
 Church of St Mary and All Saints, Fotheringhay, Northamptonshire, England
 St Mary and All Saints' Church, Great Budworth, Cheshire, England
 Church of St Mary and All Saints, Hawksworth, Nottinghamshire, England
 St Mary & All Saints' Church, Holcot, Northamptonshire, England
 St Mary and All Saints' Church, Kidderminster, Worcestershire, England
 St Mary and All Saints, Little Walsingham, Norfolk
 Church of St Mary and All Saints, Whalley, Lancashire, England
 Church of St Mary and All Saints, Willoughby-on-the-Wolds, Nottinghamshire, England